Préizerdaul is a commune in western Luxembourg, in the canton of Redange.  Until 17 July 2001, it was known as Bettborn, after its administrative centre.  Préizerdaul was the first commune to change its name since before the First World War; to date, it is the only commune to have changed its name to a name of Luxembourgish origin.

Towns within the commune include Bettborn, Platen, Pratz, and Reimberg.

Population

Twin towns — sister cities

Préizerdaul is twinned with:
 Péni, Burkina Faso
 San Agustín, El Salvador

References

External links
 

 
Towns in Luxembourg
Communes in Redange (canton)